Davide Monteleone (born 1974) is an Italian photographer. He won World Press Photo awards in 2007, 2009, and 2011. Since 2019 Monteleone is a National Geographic Storytelling Fellow.

Biography
Monteleone was born in 1974. He studied engineering but gave up on it and decided to study photography and journalism. He traveled to the United States and then to the United Kingdom to study those subjects. He started his career in 2000, working with Italian and international magazines. At the end of 2001 he moved to Moscow, where he stayed till 2003. Since then he has traveled back and forth between Italy and Russia, continuing his editorial work.

In 2007 Monteleone published his first book, Dusha (in English, Soul) and two years later published a second one, La Linea Inesistente. In 2012 he published a book titled Red Thistle, winner of, among other prizes, the European Publishers Award for Photography, the Aftermath Grant, and the Burn Emergency Photographer Grant.

In 2013 Monteleone appeared in the series of 12 episode of "Fotografi" for Sky Arte.

In 2013, with the support of Fondation Carmignac, he published the book Spasibo, of work he had produced in Chechnya.

Publications

Publications by Monteleone
Душа (Dusha) = Anima russa. Rome: Edizioni Postcart, 2007. . With text by Viktor Erofeev and Margherita Belgiojoso.
La Linea Inesistente: Viaggio Lungo la ex Cortina di Ferro. Rome: Contrasto, 2009. .
Holler – Enel Contemporanea – H+, 2012.
Red Thistle, 2012.
Rote Distel. Heidelberg: Kehrer. .
Red Thistle. Stockport: Dewi Lewis. .
Chardon Rouge. Arles: Actes Sud. .
Cardo Rosso. Rome: Peliti. .
Спасибо (Spasibo) = Spasibo. Heidelberg: Kehrer, 2013. . With text in French and English by Galia Ackerman and Masha Gessen.
The April Theses. Postcart, 2017.

Publications with contributions by Monteleone
War is Only Half the Story: Ten Years of The Aftermath Project. Dewi Lewis, 2018. Poems by Wislawa Szymborska, texts by Clare Cavanagh, Donald Weber and Sara Terry and photographs by more than forty Aftermath Award winners.

Awards
2005: Prize Amilcare Ponchielli "C’era una volta CCCP" 2nd prize at the Amilcare Ponchielli Milano
2006: World Press Photo Israeli bombing in Lebanon – 1° Prize Spot news stories
2007: TAF (Toscana Arti Fotografiche) prize, Lucca Digital Photo Fest, Lucca, for "Dusha – Russian Soul"
2008: IPA Award 2008 2nd place best book Dusha; 1st place general news editorial "Pakistan Turning Point"
2008: FotoGrafia-Book Award Best book at FotoGrafia Festival in Rome
2008: Premio Marco Bastianelli, for Dusha
2008: PDN Photo annual award Magazine Editorial Categories for Internazionale
2008: World Press Photo Abkhazia – 1° Prize General news stories
2009: Finalist for Aftermath Project grant, for "Fringe of Empire"
2009: Leica Oskar Barnack Award finalist "Russian Caucasus"
2010: Lumix Freelens Award Winner Freelens award "Northern Caucasus"
2010: Emerging Photographer Grant 2010 winner, Burn magazine, for "Northern Caucasus"
2010: Sony World Photography Awards: Professional Contemporary Issues Category, 2nd prize: "The Republic of Dagestan"
2011: Aftermath Project Grant Winner with "Red Thistle, The Northern Caucasus Journey"
2011 European Publishers Award for Photography "Red Thistle"
2011: Follow your convictions grant "Reversed See" – Maurice Lacroix – World Press Photo foundation
2011: World Press Photo Milan Fashion Week – 2nd Prize Art single
2012: EPEA 01 grant "Harragas"
2012: Awakening World Award, Tehran art project, Iran "Reversed see series": Photography section, best artist works
2013: Fondation Carmignac Photojournalism Award Spasibo
2013: POYi Feature Multimedia Story, second place, for "Nordic Odyssey: A Month at Sea". With Myles Kane, Kristina Budelis, Elissa Curtis, and The New Yorker
2014: Honorable mention Aperture Portfolio Prize, New York City
2014: PDN Best Book Award 2014, USA
2016: Fellowship Asia Society, ChinaFile, USA
2017: Finalist, W. Eugene Smith, W. Eugene Smith Memorial Fund, New York City
2017: Winner CodiceMIA, MIA Fair, Milano, Italy
2019: Finalist BMW Residency, Paris Photo, France
2019: National Geographic Storytelling Fellowship, USA
2020: Finalist, Leica Oskar Barnack Award, GE
2020: One of ten joint winners, Luis Roederer Discovery Award, Rencontres d'Arles, Arles, France

Solo exhibitions

Dusha, Lucca Foto Festival, Lucca, IT, 2007. Rencontres d'Arles, Arles, France; B gallery, Rome, 2008. Palazzo delle Esposizioni, Rome; Micamera, Milan, 2009. Casa studio Morandi, Modena, IT, 2013.
La Linea Inesistente, Palazzo delle Esposizioni, Rome, 2009. Ortygia, Siracuse, IT, 2010.
Ombre di Guerra, Rotonda della Besana, Milan, 2009. Maison européenne de la photographie, Paris, 2011.
Red Thistle, Castello Estense, Ferrara, Italy, Festival giornalismo di Internazionale; Museum of Modern and Contemporary Art of Trento and Rovereto, Rovereto, IT; Lumix Festival, Hannover, 2010. Rencontres d'Arles, New York; VII Gallery, New York; Petite Noire Gallery, Paris; Freelens gallery, Hamburg, 2012. Bursa Festival, Bursa, TR; Officine Fotografiche, Rome; Micamera, Milan, 2013.
Harragas, European photography Award, House of Photography, Hamburg, 2012; Nobel prize Center, Oslo, 2013.
Spasibo, Chapelle de l'école de beaux arts, 2013. Saatchi Gallery, London; Frankfurt Photo Forum, Frankfurt; Rencontres d'Arles, Arles, France; Museo Messina, Milan, 2014.

References

External links

1974 births
Living people
Italian photographers
VII Photo Agency photographers